Yekaterinogradskaya is a rural locality (a stanitsa) in Prokhladnensky District of the Kabardino-Balkar Republic, Russia, located near the confluence of the Malka and Terek Rivers. Population:

History
Between 1785 and 1790, Yekaterinogradskaya (then the town of Yekaterinograd) was the seat of Caucasus Oblast, one of two parts (along with Astrakhan Oblast) of Caucasus Viceroyalty. In 1790, the oblast was abolished and merged into Astrakhan Governorate.

References

Rural localities in Kabardino-Balkaria